Fatal Vision is a 1984 American true crime drama television miniseries directed by David Greene from a teleplay by John Gay, based on the 1983 novel of the same name by Joe McGinniss. The miniseries stars Karl Malden, Eva Marie Saint, Barry Newman, Gary Cole, and Andy Griffith. It recounts the celebrated case of Jeffrey R. MacDonald, the former Green Beret physician who was convicted of murdering his pregnant wife and their two small children.

The miniseries received five Primetime Emmy Award nominations, including Outstanding Drama/Comedy Special, with Malden winning Outstanding Supporting Actor in a Limited Series or a Special for his performance as MacDonald's father-in-law, Freddy Kassab.

Cast
 Gary Cole as Jeffrey R. MacDonald
 Karl Malden as Freddy Kassab
 Eva Marie Saint as Mildred Kassab
 Barry Newman as Bernie Segal
 Andy Griffith as Victor Worheide
 Gary Grubbs as James Blackburn
 Joel Polis as Brian Murtagh
 Mitchell Ryan as Paul Strombaugh
 Wendy Schaal as Colette MacDonald
 Scott Paulin as William Ivory
 Barry Corbin as Franz Grebner
 Albert Salmi as Judge Dupree
 Alexandra Johnson as Helena Stoeckley
 Paddi Edwards as Perry MacDonald
 Frank Dent as Joe McGinniss
 Carmen Argenziano as Col. Pruett
 Andy Wood as Robert Shaw
 Dennis Redfield as Peter Kearns
 Joe Mays as William Posey
 Rex Ryon as Jay MacDonald
 J.P. Bumstead as Col. Rock
 Brandy Gold as Kimberly MacDonald (age 5)
 Judith Barsi as Kimberly MacDonald (age 3)
 Dylan Galer as Kristen MacDonald
 Lance Rosen as Dennis Eisman
 Patricia Duff as Joy
 Nadine van der Velde as Randi
 Laurence Haddon as Gen. Flanagan
 Jack Rader as Provost Marshal
 Kenneth Tigar as Pathologist
 Roy London as Dr. Thornton
 Eugene Butler as Capt. Somers
 Anne Betancourt as St. Mary's Sister

Production
NBC paid $130,000 for the rights to the book, according to McGinniss, a transaction that was complicated by a prior contractual claim by Dell publishers. The miniseries was filmed in Santa Clarita and Pasadena, California, as well as at NBC Studios in Hollywood, Los Angeles, California.

Reception

Critical response
John J. O'Connor of The New York Times called the story "chilling" and the miniseries "certainly compelling", but stated it was not "as overwhelming as Mr. McGinniss's book." O'Connor also praised the cast, writing that Cole, Malden, and Saint "contribute outstanding performances." Howard Rosenberg of the Los Angeles Times lauded Fatal Vision for its "superb, meticulous storytelling that will have you on the edge of your seat, with Greene managing to convey the brutality of the crime in a surreal way without showing actual violence." Rosenberg also named it "the highest-rated miniseries of the 1984-85 season."

Accolades

References

External links
 
 
 

1984 American television series debuts
1984 American television series endings
1980s American crime drama television series
1980s American television miniseries
English-language television shows
NBC original programming
Television series based on American novels
Television series set in 1967
Television series set in 1969
Television series set in 1970
Television series set in 1971
Television series set in 1972
Television series set in 1974
Television series set in 1975
Television series set in 1976
Television series set in 1979
Television shows about murder
Television shows based on non-fiction books
Television shows filmed in California
Television shows filmed in Santa Clarita, California
Television shows set in Long Island
Television shows set in Los Angeles County, California
Television shows set in North Carolina
Television shows set in Washington, D.C.
True crime television series
Courtroom drama television series